The 1948 Little All-America college football team is composed of college football players from small colleges and universities who were selected by the Associated Press (AP) as the best players at each position. For 1948, the AP selected first, second, and third teams. Back Eddie LeBaron of Pacific and guard James Nelson of Missouri Valley were chosen for the first team for the second consecutive year.

First team
Back - Lynn Chewning, Hampden-Sydney
Back - V.T. Smith, Abilene Christian
Back - Eddie LeBaron, Pacific
Back - Jack Salscheider, St. Thomas
End - John Caskey, Appalachian State
End - Frank LoVuolo, St. Bonaventure
Tackle - Ralph Hutchinson, Chattanooga
Tackle - Jack Geary, Wesleyan
Guard - James Nelson, Missouri Valley
Guard - Robert Osgood, Central Washington
Center - William Wehr, Denison

Second team
Back - Lawrence Orr, Adams State
Back - Alva Baker, Missouri Valley
Back - Fred Wendt, Texas Mines
Back - Dan Towler, Washington & Jefferson
End - Richard Brown, Puget Sound
End - William Klein, Hanover
Tackle - Raymond Evans, Texas Mines
Tackle - Manuel Bass, Cal Tech
Guard - Art Oley, Randolph-Macon
Guard - James Clary, Wofford
Center - Jason Loving, Iowa Teachers

Third team
Back - Lee Spear, Catawba
Back - Herman Bryson, Appalachian State
Back - Edward Rupp, Denison
Back - Roland Malcolm, Gustavus Adolphus
End - Andrew Robustelli, Arnold
End - Douglas Loveday, Wofford
Tackle - Thomas Donan, Bloomsburg Teachers
Tackle - William Oaks, Augustana (IL)
Guard - Johnson Waldrum, Sul Ross
Guard - Rudolph Smith, Louisiana Tech
Center - Robert Basich, St. Martin's

See also
 1948 College Football All-America Team

References

Little All-America college football team
Little All-America college football teams